The Deputy Leader of the Government in the Legislative Council, is an office held in New South Wales by the second most senior minister in the New South Wales Legislative Council. People who served as the deputy leader are:

References

Legislative Council Leader
New South Wales Legislative Council